= Wuhan Poly Plaza =

Building in Wuhan, China

Coordinates: 30°32′47.5″N 114°19′48″E

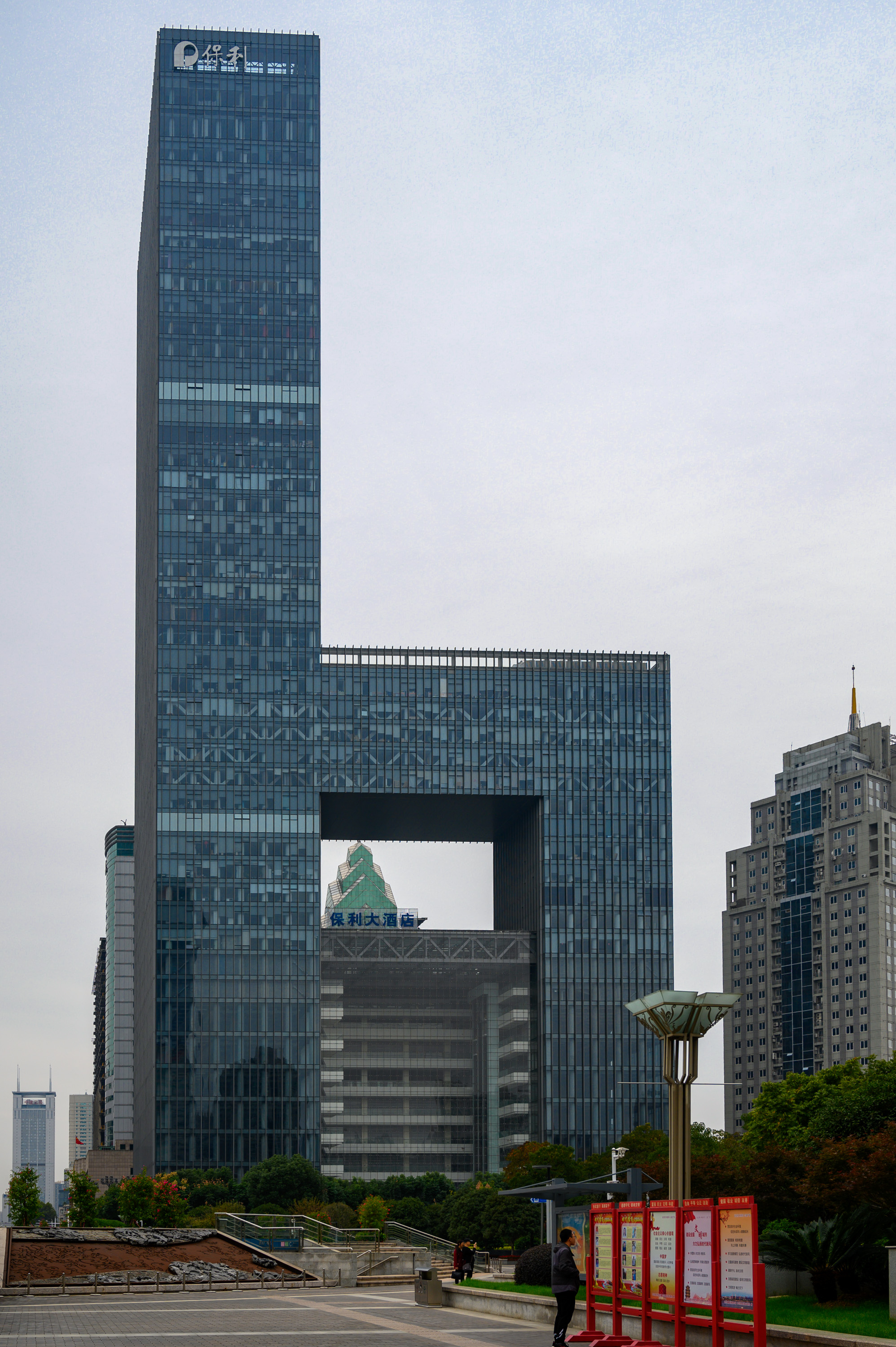
- Interactive map of the Wuhan Poly Plaza area

General information
- Status: Completed
- Location: Zhongnan Road and Hongshan Square, Wuchang District, Wuhan, China
- Groundbreaking: 2009
- Completed: 2012
- Cost: 760,000,000 yuan

Height
- Roof: 221 meters

Technical details
- Floor count: 46 (above) + 4 (underground)
- Floor area: 149,000 m2

Design and construction
- Architect: Skidmore, Owings & Merrill
- Developer: Hubei Poly Property Group

Wuhan Poly Plaza, previously named Wuhan Poly Culture Plaza, is west of the intersection of Zhongnan Road and Hongshan Square in the Wuchang District of Wuhan, China. Its height is 221 meters, measured from surface to its roof; it has no spires. Designed by Skidmore, Owings & Merrill, it has a floor area of 149,000 m^{2}, which includes both the 46 floors of the main tower and 20 floors of its annex. With a design similar to a chair, the building leaves an open space between the main tower and its annex, below the bridge connecting those two at the height of its 20th floor. Floor 1 to 5 is designed as a shopping mall, 6 and 7 as restaurant and food court, 8 for a movie theater, and the rest of the floors for office space.

== Gallery ==
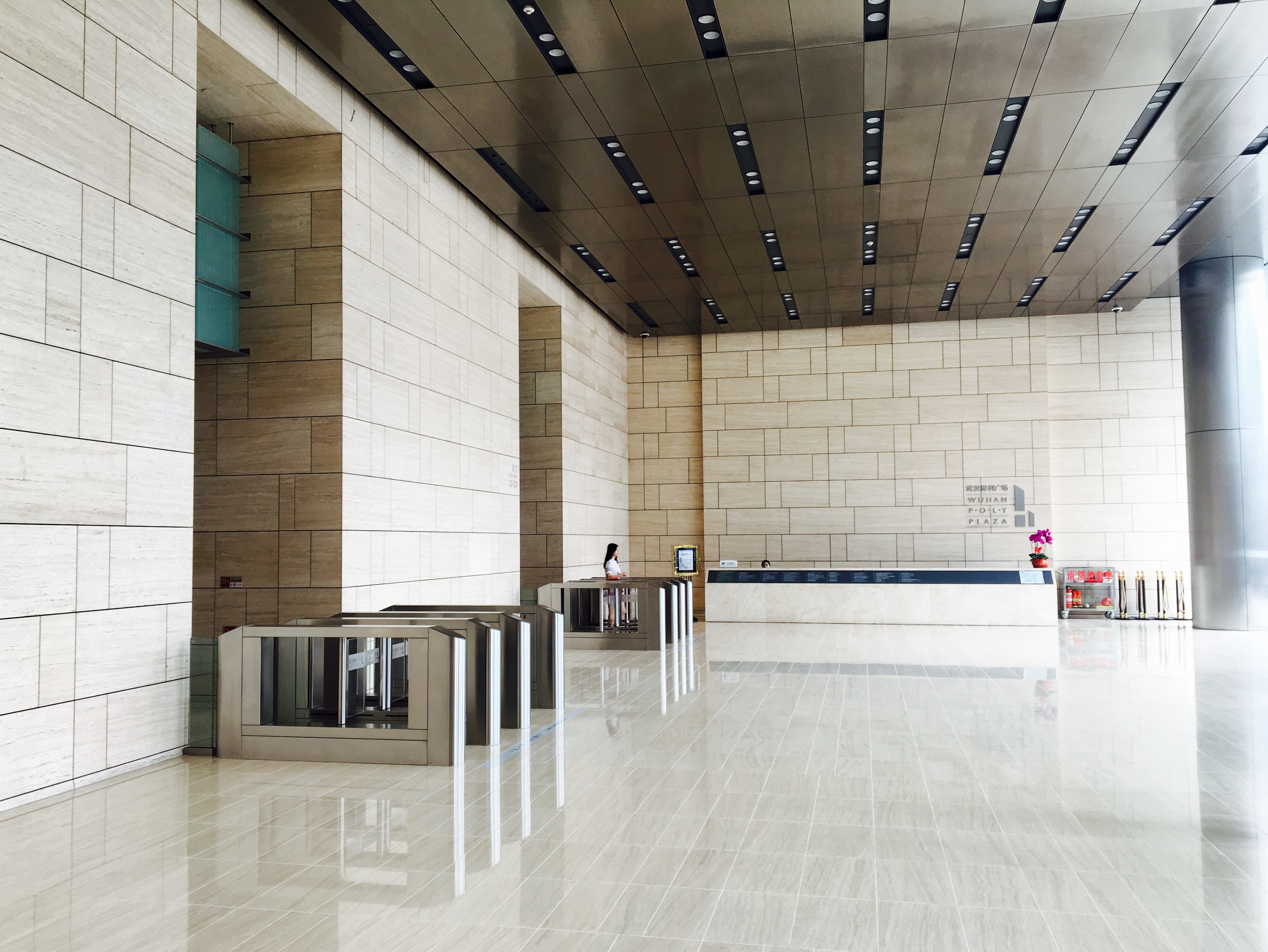
Lobby of Wuhan Poly Plaza
